Lintula Holy Trinity Convent or Lintula Convent ( or) is a small Orthodox Christian convent located in Palokki, Heinävesi, Finland, close to the New Valamo Monastery. The monastery was founded in 1895 on the isthmus of Karelia, in the parish of Kivennapa. In 1946, the Convent moved to Heinävesi.

See also
 List of Christian religious houses in Finland

External links

 Lintula Convent by the Finnish Orthodox Church 

Heinävesi
Eastern Orthodox monasteries in Finland
19th-century Christian monasteries
Buildings and structures in South Savo
1895 establishments in Finland
Orthodox Church of Finland
19th-century churches in Finland